Henri Vannérus (29 July 1833 – 16 May 1921) was a Luxembourgian politician, jurist, and diplomat.

An Orangist, he twice served as Minister for Justice, in the governments of Victor de Tornaco (1864 – 1866) and Emmanuel Servais (1867 – 1874).  Vannérus was later a member of the Council of State from 1874 until his death in 1921, and served as President for two spells totalling twenty years (1888 – 1889, 1895 – 1914).  After his second stint as President of the Council of State, he became Luxembourg's chargé d'affaires in Paris.  Throughout this period, he formed a close connection with Paul Eyschen and Mathias Mongenast, thanks in no small part to all being from the town of Diekirch.

There is a street in South Bonnevoie, Luxembourg City, named after Vannérus (rue Henri Vannérus).

Footnotes

|-

|-

|-

Ministers for Finances of Luxembourg
Presidents of the Council of State of Luxembourg
Members of the Chamber of Deputies (Luxembourg)
Members of the Council of State of Luxembourg
Luxembourgian Orangists
Independent politicians in Luxembourg
1833 births
1921 deaths
People from Diekirch
19th-century Luxembourgian people